Trémorel (Gallo: Termorae) is a commune in the Côtes-d'Armor department of Brittany in northwestern France.

Geography
The river Meu flows southeast through the northern part of the commune.

Map

Population

Inhabitants of Trémorel are called trémorelois in French.

See also
Communes of the Côtes-d'Armor department

References

External links

Official website 

Communes of Côtes-d'Armor